The following is a list of songs by MGMT.

References

MGMT songs
MGMT